Hof Ashkelon Regional Council (Mo'atza Azorit Hof Ashkelon, lit. Ashkelon Coast Regional Council) is a regional council in the Southern District of Israel.

The council is bordered to the north by Be'er Tuvia Regional Council, to the east by the Be'er Tuvia, Lakhish, Shafir and Yoav Regional Councils, to the south by Sha'ar HaNegev Regional Council and the Gaza Strip, and to the west by Ashkelon and the Mediterranean Sea.

List of communities
The council covers 19 communities, including five kibbutzim, eleven moshavim, two community settlements and a youth village.

External links
Official website 

 
Regional councils in Israel
1950 establishments in Israel